Lake was a former unincorporated community located on the north shore of Henrys Lake in Fremont County, Idaho, United States, that is now part of the city of Island Park.

Island Park is part of the Rexburg Micropolitan Statistical Area.

Transportation
A state highway passes through the community:

See also
 Flat Rock, Idaho
 Last Chance, Idaho
 Staley Springs, Idaho

References

Unincorporated communities in Fremont County, Idaho
Unincorporated communities in Idaho
Island Park, Idaho
Rexburg, Idaho micropolitan area
Former populated places in Idaho